Milada Skrbková (later Žemlová; 30 May 1897 – 2 October 1935) was a Czech tennis player. At the 1920 Olympics she won a bronze medal in the mixed doubles, playing with her future husband Ladislav Žemla. She was the first woman to represent Czechoslovakia at the Olympics.

References

1897 births
1935 deaths
Czech female tennis players
Czechoslovak female tennis players
Tennis players from Prague
Olympic bronze medalists for Czechoslovakia
Olympic tennis players of Czechoslovakia
Tennis players at the 1920 Summer Olympics
Olympic medalists in tennis
Medalists at the 1920 Summer Olympics